Darband is a village in Dasht Rural District, Silvaneh District, Urmia County, West Azerbaijan Province, Iran. At the 2006 census, its population was 465, in 85 families.

References 

Populated places in Urmia County